Love Is a Long Road is the third studio album by Canadian country music group High Valley. It was released on June 12, 2012 by Open Road Recordings in Canada and by Centricity Music in the United States. It includes the single "Have I Told You I Love You Lately" and the group's debut US release, "Love You for a Long Time".

Track listing

Personnel

High Valley
Brad Rempel - vocals
Bryan Rempel - bass guitar, vocals
Curtis Rempel - beat box, vocals

Additional Musicians
Tom Bukovac - electric guitar
Kevin "Swine" Grantt - bass guitar
Tony Harrell - accordion
Jim Hoke - harmonica
Josh Matheny - dobro
Greg Morrow - drums
Phil O'Donnell - acoustic guitar, electric guitar, percussion
John Osborne - acoustic guitar, resonator guitar, hi-string guitar, mandolin
Jeremy Spillman - organ, percussion, piano, synthesizer
Bryan Sutton - banjo, acoustic guitar, mandolin
Oran Thornton - bass guitar, acoustic guitar, baritone guitar
John Willis - acoustic guitar

Chart performance

Singles

References

External links
 Love Is a Long Road at AllMusic

2012 albums
High Valley albums
Centricity Music albums
Open Road Recordings albums